Alanen is a Finnish surname. Notable people with the surname include:

Emmi Alanen (born 1991), Finnish footballer
Ivar Alanen (1863–1936), Finnish politician
Jere-Matias Alanen (born 1996), Finnish professional ice hockey winger
Lilli Alanen (1941-2021), Finnish philosopher
Pekka Alanen (born 1945), Finnish wrestler

Finnish-language surnames